(born July 7, 1973) is a Japanese manga artist best known for creating the series Fruits Basket.

Takaya was born and raised in Tokyo, where she made her debut as a manga artist in 1992. Takaya is left handed and had wanted to be a manga artist since first grade, when her sister started drawing.

Her manga series Fruits Basket, which debuted in 1998, became one of the best selling  manga in North America. Fruits Basket has also been adapted into an anime series twice; the first, which premiered in 2001, aired as one season of twenty six episodes. The second, which premiered in 2019, consists of two seasons of twenty five episodes and the third season comprised 13 episodes and concluded in 2021.

In 2001, Takaya received the Kodansha Manga Award for  manga for Fruits Basket. As revealed in a sidebar of Fruits Basket, Takaya broke her drawing arm (her left arm) after Fruits Basket volume six was published. She had to go into surgery, and as a result, had put Fruits Basket on a brief hiatus. Takaya made a full recovery, but complained that her handwriting had gotten uglier due to the surgery.

Works

References

External links

 
1973 births
Living people
Japanese female comics artists
Female comics writers
Women manga artists
Manga artists from Tokyo
Winner of Kodansha Manga Award (Shōjo)